The German Chess Federation (DSB) is the umbrella organization for German chess players. It is a member of the Deutscher Olympischer Sportbund and of FIDE, the World Chess Federation. It has over 90,000 members  in over 2500 clubs, making it one of the world's largest national chess federations. Its members are 17 regional chess federations, the German Blind and Visually Impaired Chess Federation (DBSB), Die Schwalbe (chess composition society), the German Correspondence Chess Federation (BdF) and the Chess Bundesliga.

References

External links
  

Germany
Chess in Germany
Chess
Chess organizations
1877 establishments in Germany
Sports organizations established in 1877
1877 in chess